This is a list of plants found in the wild in Caatinga vegetation of Brazil.

Acanthaceae
 Anisacanthus brasiliensis Lindau
 Anisacanthus trilobus Lindau
 Lophostachys floribunda Ness
 Ruellia asperula Benth. & Hook.f.
 Ruellia geminiflora Kunth

Amaranthaceae
 Alternanthera brasiliana (L.) Kuntze
 Alternanthera moquini (Webb ex Moq.) Dusen  
 Gomphrena reticulata Seub.
 Gomphrena prostrata Mart.
 Iresine polymorpha  Mart.

Anacardiaceae
 Myracrodruon urundeuva  M.Allemão
 Schinopsis brasiliensis Engl.
 Schinus terebinthifolius Raddi
 Spondias tuberosa Arruda

Annonaceae
 Annona coriacea Mart.
 Annona glabra Forssk.
 Annona spinescens Mart.
 Xylopia frutescens Aubl.

Apocynaceae
 Allamanda anothearifolia A.DC.
 Allamanda blanchetii A.DC.
 Allamanda puberula A.DC.
 Aspidosperma polyneuron Müll.Arg.
 Aspidosperma populifolium A.DC.
 Aspidosperma pyricollum Müll.Arg.
 Condylocarpon isthmicum = Condylocarpus ishtimicum (Vell.) A.DC.
 Hancornia speciosa Gomes
 Himatanthus lancifolia (Müll.Arg.) Woodson  
 Odontadenia lutea  (Vell.) Markgr.  
 Peschiera affinis (Müll.Arg.) Miers

Arecaceae
 Acrocomia aculeata (Jacq.) Lodd. ex Mart.
 Cocos capitata Mart.
 Cocos coronata Mart. 
 Syagrus comosa Mart.
 Syagrus flexuosa Mart. Becc.

Aristolochiaceae
 Aristolochia allemanii Hoehne
 Aristolochia brasiliensis Mart. et Zucc.
 Aristolochia cymbifera Mart. et Zucc.
 Aristolochia cordigera Willd. ex Klotzsch  
 Aristolochia galeata Mart. et Zucc.
 Aristolochia gigantea Mart. et Zucc.

Asteraceae
 Acanthospermum australe (Loef.) O. Kunze
 Acanthospermum hispidum DC.
 Dasyphyllum brasiliensis
 Eupatorium amygdalinum Lam.
 Eupatorium bracteatum Gardn.
 Eupatorium laevis DC.
 Gochnatia amplexifolia  (Gardn.) Cabr.
 Gochnatia blanchetiana (DC.) Cabr.
 Mikania cordifolia Willd.
 Mikania macrophylla Schultz. Bip.
 Mikania reticulata DC.
 Parthenium histerophorus L.
 Spilanthes acmella L.  
 Vanillosmopsis brasiliensis
 Vernonia ligulaeflora  Less.
 Vernonia polyanthes Less.
 Vernonia scorpioides Pers.

Bignoniaceae
 Alsocydia erubescens Mart. ex DC.
 Anemopaegma glaucum Mart.
 Arrabidea rotundata Bur.
 Arrabidea trichoclata Burr.
 Batocydia unguis Mart.
 Cuspidaria cordata Maltos
 Distictes mansoana Pers.
 Friedericia speciosa Mart.
 Handroanthus impetiginosus
 Jacaranda brasiliana Pers.
 Jacaranda caroba DC.
 Jacaranda cuspidifolia Mart.
 Jacaranda elegans Mart.
 Lundia nitidula Mart.
 Pyrostegia venusca (Ker-Gavahl) Miers.
 Tabebuia avellanedae Lorentz et Giseb.
 Tabebuia caraiba (Mart.) Bur.
 Tabebuia chrysotricha (Mart. ex DC.) Stand.
 Tabebuia geminiflora Rizz. & Mattos

Bombacaceae
 Cavanillesia arborea (Willd.) K. Schum
 Chorisia ventricosa Mart.
 Ceiba jasminodora K. Schum.
 Ceiba pentandra Gaertn.
 Ceiba rivieri K. Schum.

Boraginaceae
 Auxemma glazioviana Taub.
 Auxemma oncocalyx Taub.
 Cordia insignis Cham.
 Cordia leucocephala Moric.
 Cordia nodosa Lam.
 Cordia trichotoma (Vell.) Mart.
 Heliotropium claussenii DC.
 Heliotropium laceolatum Loefg.

Bromeliaceae
 Aechmea bromeliaefolia Mart.
 Bromelia laciniosa 
 Neoglaziovia variegata Mez.

Burseraceae
 Bursera leptophloeus (Mart.) Engl.
 Protium heptaphyllum Mart.

Cactaceae
 Brasilicereus brevifolius Ritter
 Cereus jamacaru DC.
 Cereus lindmanianus Bruin & Bred
 Cereus squamosus Guerck.
 Coleocephalocereus aureus Ritter
 Coleocephalocereus pupureus Bruin & Bred
 Melanocactus azureus Bruin & Bred      
 Melanocactus bahiensis (Br. & R.) Werderm
 Melanocactus goniodacanthus Lem.
 Melanocactus leusselinkianus Brin & bred.
 Melanocactus oreas Miq.
 Opuntia inamoema K. Schum.
 Opuntia monacantha Haw.
 Pereskia aculeata Mill.
 Pereskia aureiflora Ritter
 Pereskia quiabenta Gurcke
 Pilocereus cenepequei Rizz & Mattos
 Pilocereus glaucescens (Lab.) Byl. & Powl.
 Pilocereus magnificus (Bui & Breel) Ritter
 Pilocereus multicostatus Ritter
 Quiabentia zehntneri (Br. et Ros.) Br. et Ros.
 Rhodocactus bahiensis (Gürke) I.Asai & K.Miyata

Caesalpinioideae
 Apuleia leiocarpa (Vog.) Macbr.
 Bauhinia acureana Moric.
 Bauhinia cheilanta (Bong.) Steud.
 Bauhinia coronata Benth.
 Bauhinia forficata Link.
 Bauhinia microphylla Vog.
 Bauhinia pulchella Benth.
 Bauhinia radiana Vell.
 Bauhinia rubiginosa Bong.
 Bauhinia scadens Benth.
 Caesalpinia bracteosa Tul.
 Caesalpinia ferrea Mart ex Tul.
 Caesalpinia microphylla Mart.
 Caesalpinia pyramidalis Tul. 
 Cassia ferruginea (Schrad.) DC. 
 Cassia sericea Swartz
 Cenostigma gardneriana Tul.
 Copaifera martii Hayne
 Senna alata (L.) Irwin & Barneby 
 Senna excelsa (Schrad) Irwin & Barneby  
 Senna martiana (Schrad) Irwin & Barneby  
 Senna multijuga (Rich.) Irwin & Barneby  
 Senna speciosa (Schrad) Irwin & Barneby

Cannabaceae
 Trema micrantha (L.) Blume

Capparaceae
 Capparis flexuosa L.
 Cleome affinis L.
 Cleome spinosa Jacq.

Cecropiaceae
 Cecropia hololeuca Miq.

Celastraceae
 Maytenus obtusifolia Mart.
 Maytenus rigida Mart.

Chrysobalanaceae
 Hirtella americana Aubl.
 Hirtella glandulosa Spreng.    
 Hirtella martiana Hook.
 Licania rigida Mart.

Clusiaceae
 Rheedia gardneriana Lindl. & Trin.

Cochlospermaceae
 Cochlospermum insigne A.St.-Hil.

Combretaceae
 Combretum lanceolatum Pohl.
 Combretum elegans Camb.
 Combretum leprosum Mart.
 Combretum monetaria Mart.

Convolvulaceae
 Evolvulus glomeratus Ness
 Evolvulus pusillus Choisy 
 Ipomoea acuminata Roem. & Schl. 
 Ipomoea aristolochiaefolia (H.B.K.) Don.
 Ipomoea daturaefolia Meisn.
 Ipomoea cairica (L.) Sweet.
 Ipomoea cynanchifolia (Meisn.) Mart.
 Ipomoea horrida Huber
 Ipomoea quamoclit L.
 Merremia aegyptia (L.) Urban
 Merremia cissoides (Lam.) Hallier 
 Merremia macrocalyx (Ruiz & Pava) O'Donnel

Cucurbitaceae
 Cucumis anguria L.
 Melothria fluminensis Gardn.
 Sicana odorifera Naud.
 Trianosperma tayuya Mart.

Dilleniaceae
 Davilla rugosa Poit.

Euphorbiaceae
 Croton antisyphiliticus Mart.
 Croton campestris A.St.-Hil.
 Croton hemiargyrus Mull. Arg.
 Croton lundianus (Dried.) M. Arg. 
 Croton sondterianus M. Arg.
 Croton zenhtneri Pax. & Hoffm.
 Dalechampia scandens L.
 Euphorbia phosphorea Mart.
 Jatropha osteocarpa M. Arg.
 Jatropha urens (L.) M. Arg.
 Julocroton furcescens (Spreng.) Baill.
 Julocroton humilis Diedr.
 Julocroton lanceolatus M. Arg.
 Julocroton triqueter M. Arg.
 Manihot glaziovii M. Arg.
 Manihot stipularis M. Arg.
 Stillingia argudentata Jabl.

Faboideae
 Abrus precatorius L.
 Aeschynomene brasiliana (Poir.) DC.
 Aeschynomene evenia Whigh.
 Aeschynomene falcata (Poir.) DC.
 Aeschynomene histrix Poir.
 Aeschynomene gilbertoi Brandão
 Aeschynomene laca-buendiana Brandão 
 Aeschynomene martii Benth.
 Aeschynomene paniculata Vog.
 Aeschynomene paucifolia Vog.
 Aeschynomene riedeliana Taub.
 Aeschynomene selloi Vog.
 Arachis prostata Benth.
 Arachis pusilla Benth.
 Browdichia virgilioides H.B.K.
 Calopogonium coeruleum Hemsl.
 Calopogonium mucunoides Desv.
 Camptosema tomentosum Benth.
 Centrobium robustum (Vell.) Mart.
 Centrosema angustifolium Benth.
 Centrosema arenarium Benth.
 Centrosema brasilianum (L.) Benth.
 Centrosema dasyanthum Benth.
 Centrosema macranthum Hoehne
 Centrosema plumerii (Turp. ex Pres.) Benth.
 Centrosema pubescens Benth.
 Centrosema sagittatum (Willd.) Brad.
 Centrosema vexillatum Benth.
 Coursetia rostrata Benth.
 Cratylia floribunda Benth.
 Cratylia mollis Mart.
 Cratylia nuda Tul.
 Crotalaria anagyroides H.B.K.
 Crotalaria incana Benth.
 Crotalaria retusa L.
 Crotalaria pallida Ait.
 Dalbergia decipularis Rizz. & Mattos
 Dalbergia euxylophora
 Desmodium adscendens DC.
 Desmodium discolor Vog.
 Desmodium molle DC.
 Desmodium spirale DC.
 Dioclea grandiflora Mart.
 Eriosema crinitum Benth.
 Eriosema heterophyllum Benth.
 Erythrina mulungu Mart.
 Erythrina velutina Willd.
 Galactia rhynchosioides A.St.-Hil.
 Galactia tenuiflora Whrigt et Ann.
 Geoffraea spinosa Jacq.
 Indigofera suffruticosa Mill.
 Machaerium angustifolium Vog.
 Machaerium scleroxylum Tul. 
 Macriptilium bracteolatus (Nees & Mart.) Urb.
 Macriptilium firmulus (Mart.) Urban
 Macriptilium gracilis (Poep. & Benth.) Urban
 Macriptilium lathyroides (L.) Urb. ex Marech 
 Macriptilium panduratus (Mart. ex Benth.) Urb.
 Macriptilium sabaraense (Hoehne) V. P. Barbosa
 Playmiscium blancheti Benth.
 Playmiscium nitens Vog.
 Rhynchosia exaltata DC.
 Rhynchosia minima DC.
 Rhynchosia phaseoloides DC.
 Rhynchosia senna Gill.
 Stizolobium deeringianum Bort.
 Stylosanthes capitata Vog.
 Stylosanthes gracilis H.B.K.
 Stylosanthes grandiflora Ferr. & Costa
 Stylosanthes guianensis (Aubl.) Sw.
 Stylosanthes macrocephala Ferr. & Costa
 Stylosanthes pilosa Ferr. & Costa
 Stylosanthes scabra Vog.
 Teramnus volubilis Sw.
 Teramnus uncinatus Sw.
 Zolernia ilicifolia Vog.
 Zornia acauensis Brandão & Costa
 Zornia brasiliensis Vog.
 Zornia crinita (Mohl.)Vanni
 Zornia curvata Mohl.
 Zornia flemingioides Moric.
 Zornia gardneriana Moric.
 Zornia gemella Mohl.
 Zornia latifolia Sm.
 Zornia mitziana Costa
 Zornia myriadena Benth.
 Zornia pardiana Mohl.

Flacourtiaceae
 Casearia  commersiana  
 Casearia guianensis Urb.
 Casearia rufens Camb.
 Xylosma salzmanni Eich.

Hippocrateaceae
 Salacia elliptica (Mart.) Peyr.

Hydrophyllaceae
 Hydrangea spinosa L.

Lamiaceae
 Hyptis lanceolata Poir.
 Hyptis lantanaefolia Poir.
 Hyptis multiflora Pohl.
 Hyptis pectinata Poir.
 Hyptis suaveolens Poir.
 Ocimum fliminensis Vell.
 Ocimum incanescens Mart.
 Peltodon radicans Pohl.

Lauraceae
 Ocotea variabilis Meisn.

Loganiaceae
 Spigelia anthelmia L.

Loranthaceae
 Pithirusa sp.
 Psitacanthus robustus  Mart.

Lythraceae
 Ammannia coccinea Roth.
 Cuphea lutescens Hoehne
 Cuphea speciosa Mart.
 Diplusodon rotundifolia DC.

Malpighiaceae
 Banisteriopsis oxyclada  (A. Juss.) Gates
 Banisteriopsis pubipetala (A. Juss.) Gates
 Banisteriopsis stellaris (Gris.) Gates
 Byrsonima crassifolia A. Juss.
 Byrsonima sericea A. Juss.
 Byrsonima variabilis A. Juss.
 Byrsonima verbascifolia A. Juss. 
 Mascagnia rigida Gris. Juss.
 Stigmaphyllon urenifolium A. Juss.

Malvaceae
 Bourgenhadia nemoralis (A.St.-Hil.) Monteiro
 Gaya gracilipes K. Schum.
 Gaya pilosa K. Schum.

Melastomataceae
 Miconia chamissonis Naud.
 Mouriria guianensis Aubl.
 Mouriria pusa Gardn.
 Tibouchina stenoccarpa Cogn.

Meliaceae
 Cabralea cangerana (Vell.) Mart.
 Cedrela fissilis Vel.
 Guarea trichilioides L.
 Trichilia columata Guardi

Mimosoideae
 Acacia farnesiana Willd.
 Acacia paniculata Willd.
 Adenanthera pavonina L.
 Anadenanthera contorta (Benth.) Brenan
 Anadenanthera falcata (Benth.) Brenan
 Anadenanthera macrocarpa (Benth.) Brenan
 Anadenanthera peregrina (Benth.) Brenan
 Calliandra depauperata Benth.
 Calliandra leptopoda Benth.
 Calliandra macrocalyx Harms.
 Calliandra myriophylla Benth.
 Calliandra peckoltii Benth.
 Calliandra speciosa Ducke
 Calliandra turbinata Benth. 
 Calliandra viscidula Benth.
 Desmanthus virgatus Benth.
 Enterolobium contortisiliquum (Vell.) Morong
 Inga bahiensis Benth.
 Inga edulis Mart.
 Inga marginata Willd.
 Mimosa caesalpinaefolia Benth.
 Mimosa hostilis Benth.
 Mimosa malacocentra Mart. ex Benth.
 Mimosa modesta Mart.
 Mimosa pigra L.
 Mimosa pteridifolia Benth.
 Mimosa sepiaria Benth.
 Mimosa velloziana
 Mimosa quadrivalvis L.
 Mimosa ursina Mart.
 Mimosa verrucosa Benth.
 Pithecellobium avaremoto Mart.
 Pithecellobium diversifolium Benth.
 Pithecellobium dumosum Benth.
 Pithecellobium foliolosum Benth.
 Pithecellobium inopinatum (Harms.) Dicke
 Pithecellobium multiflorum Benth.
 Platymenia reticulata Benth. 
 Pterogyne nitens Tul.
 Schrankia leptocarpha DC.
 Stryphnodendron coriaceum Benth.

Myrsinaceae
 Rapanea guianensis Aubl.

Myrtaceae
 Campomanesia adamantium Blume
 Campomanesia corymbosa Blume
 Eugenia stictopetapa DC.
 Psidium araao Raddi

Nyctaginaceae
 Bougainvillea fasciculata Brandão
 Bougainvillea glabra Choisy
 Bougainvillea spectabilis Willd.

Ochnaceae
 Ouratea parviflora Baill.
 Ouratea spectabilis (Mart.) Spreng.

Orchidaceae
 Catasetum sp.
 Habenaria sp.
 Oncidium sp.

Oxalidaceae
 Oxalis nigrescens A.St.-Hil.

Passifloraceae
 Passiflora cincinnata Masters
 Passiflora digitata L.
 Passiflora foetida L.
 Passiflora gardneri Masters
 Passiflora kermesina Link & Otto (=Passiflora raddiana DC.)
 Passiflora rubra L.
 Passiflora serratodigitata L.
 Passiflora tenuifila Killip.

Phytolaccaceae
 Gallezia gorazema Moq.

Piperaceae
 Piper angustifolium  Ruiz & Pav.
 Pothomorphe peltata Miq.

Plumbaginaceae
 Plumbago scandens L.

Poaceae
 Andropogon bicornis L.
 Andropogon leucostachys H.B.K.
 Aristida adscensionis L.
 Aristida pallens Cav.
 Axonopus cpmpressus Beauv.
 Cenchrus echinatus L.
 Dactyloctenium aegyptium (L.) Beauv.
 Digitaria insularis (L.) Benth.
 Eleusine indica (L.) Gaetrn.
 Eragrotis pilosa (L.) Beauv.
 Hyparrhenia rufa (Ness) Stapf.
 Merostachys riedelliana Rop.
 Paspalum notatum Flugge
 Pennisetum setosum (Sw.) L. Rich.
 Rhynchelitrum repens (Willd.) Hubbard.
 Sporobolus argutas Kunth.

Portulacaceae
 Portulaca oleracea L.
 Portulaca pilosa L.
 Talinum patens
 Talinum triangulare (Jacq.) Willd.

Polygalaceae
 Bredemeyera floribunda Willd.
 Bredemeyera brevifolia (Benth.) Brenan
 Polygala cuspidata DC.
 Polygala hebeclada
 Polygala longicaulis H.B.K
 Polygala urbanii Chod.
 Secondatia floribunda A. DC.

Polygonaceae
 Polygonum acre L.
 Polygonum hidropiperoides Michx.
 Polygonum hispidium H.B.K.
 Polygonum spectabilis Mart.
 Tripalis pachau Mart.

Rhamnaceae
 Celtis iguanea (Jacq.) Planch.
 Reissekia smilacina Endl.
 Zizyphus joazeiro Mart.

Rubiaceae
 Genipa americana L.
 Guettarda angelica Mart.
 Mannetia ignita K. Schum.
 Mitracarpus hirtus (L.) DC.
 Palicoures marcgravii A.St.-Hil.
 Pectis brevipedunculata (Gardn.) Sch. Bip.
 Randia armata (Sw.) DC.
 Tocoyena formosa Schum.

Rutaceae
 Galipa jasminifolia

Sapindaceae
 Cardiospermum grandiflorum Sw.
 Cardiospermum halicacabum
 Paulinia elegans Camb.
 Sapindus saponaria L.
 Serjanea lethalis A.St.-Hil.
 Serjanea mansiana Mart.
 Serjanea paucidentata Radlk
 Urvillea ulmacea H.B.K.

Sapotaceae
 Bumelia startorum Mart.

Scrophulariaceae
 Scoparia dulcis L.

Selaginellaceae
 Selaginella convoluta (Walk.& Arnoff) Spreng.

Simarubaceae
 Simaruba versicolor A.St.-Hil.

Solanaceae
 Acnistus arborescens
 Datura fastuosa L.
 Solanum erianthum Don.
 Solanum horridum Don.
 Solanum paniculatum L.

Sterculiaceae
 Guazuma ulmifolia Lam.
 Melochia hermanoides A.St.-Hil.
 Melochia villosa (Mill.) Farwc.
 Sterculia striata A.St.-Hil. et Naud.
 Waltheria bracteosa A.St.-Hil. et Naud.

Styracaceae

 Styrax parvifolium Pohl.

Tiliaceae
 Apeiba tibourbou Aubl.
 Luehea candicans Mart.
 Luehea divaricataMart.

Turneraceae
 Piriqueta aurea (Camb.) Urban
 Pirequeta duarteana (Camb.) Juss.
 Turnera melochioides Camb.
 Turnera ulmifolia L.

Urticaceae
 Fleurya aestuans Gaudich.
 Urera baccifera Gaudich.

Verbenaceae
 Aegiphylla sellowiana Cham.
 Lantana camara L.
 Lantana lilaciana Desf.
 Lantana microphylla L.

Violaceae
 Anchietea saluataris A.St.-Hil.

Vitaceae
 Cissus erosa L. C. Rich.
 Cissus scabra
 Cissus sicyoides L.
 Cissus warmingii

Vochysiaceae
 Callistene major Mart.
 Qualea parviflora Mart.
 Vochysia tucanorum Mart.

See also
 List of plants of Amazon Rainforest vegetation of Brazil
 List of plants of Atlantic Forest vegetation of Brazil
 List of plants of Cerrado vegetation of Brazil
 List of plants of Pantanal vegetation of Brazil
 Official list of endangered flora of Brazil

References
 ANDRADE-LIMA, D. (1981). O domínio da caatinga. (The caatinga dominium.) Revista Brasileira de Botânica 4:149-163.
 BRANDÃO, M.; GAVILANES, M. L. (1994). Composição florística das áreas recobertas pela Caatinga na área mineira da SUDENE. Informe Agropecuário 17 (181):20-33. 
  Gamarra-Rojas, Cíntia. (2005) Checklist das Plantas do Nordeste (Checklist of Plants of Northeast Brazil). Online 
 GIULIETTI, M. A. et alli. (2003) Diagnóstico da vegetação nativa do bioma Caatinga. Ministério do Meio AmbienteOnline

 Caatinga
Caatinga
Caatinga